The election for Resident Commissioner to the United States House of Representatives took place on November 8, 1988, the same day as the larger Puerto Rican general election and the United States elections, 1988.

Candidates for Resident Commissioner
 Jaime Fuster for the Popular Democratic Party
 Luis Pío Sánchez Longo for the Puerto Rican Independence Party
 Pedro Rosselló for the New Progressive Party

Election results

See also 
Puerto Rican general election, 1988

References 

1988 Puerto Rico elections
Puerto Rico
1988